Aleksandras Antipovas (born 9 March 1955 in Bogdanyu, Soviet Union) is a retired Lithuanian long-distance runner who represented the USSR under the name Aleksandr Antipov.

Achievements

External links 
 
 
 

1955 births
Living people
Lithuanian male long-distance runners
Soviet male long-distance runners
Athletes (track and field) at the 1980 Summer Olympics
Olympic athletes of the Soviet Union
European Athletics Championships medalists